Hester Jackson-McCray (born May 19, 1961) is an American politician in the state of Mississippi. A member of the Democratic Party, she is the representative for District 40 of the Mississippi House of Representatives, defeating incumbent Ashley Henley.
Jackson-McCray was the first African American to represent DeSoto County in the Legislature, and she will be just the third African American to represent a majority-white legislative district since Reconstruction.

Biography 
She was born on May 19, 1961, in Drew, Mississippi. She is a nurse and lives in Horn Lake, Mississippi.

References

Living people
1961 births
American nurses
Democratic Party members of the Mississippi House of Representatives
African-American state legislators in Mississippi
Women state legislators in Mississippi
21st-century American women politicians
21st-century American politicians
American women nurses
People from DeSoto County, Mississippi
21st-century African-American women
21st-century African-American politicians
20th-century African-American people
20th-century African-American women
African-American nurses